The 2007 Dakar Rally was the 29th running of the event. It started in Lisbon, Portugal on 6 January and ran through Europe and Africa until 21 January 2007. It was the last time the event would take place in Europe and Africa, as the 2008 event was cancelled.  A replacement race in Europe was held, and moved to South America from 2009.

Entries

Bikes

Cars

Trucks

Route
The race began in Lisbon, Portugal, and passed through Spain, Morocco, Western Sahara, Mauritania, Mali, and Senegal. There was a rest day in Atar, Mauritania on 13 January.
pdf file showing 2007 route

Stages

Note: The timed section of stage 7 was shortened to  due to adverse weather conditions.

Top-3 riders per stage

Motorcycles

Cars

Trucks

Final standings
A total of 132 bikes (52.8% of starters), 109 cars (58.3%), and 60 trucks (68.2%) finished the race.

Motorcycles

Cars

Trucks

Incidents 

The 2007 event was marred by the deaths of two competitors, both in the motorcycle division. The first was South African motorcyclist Elmer Symons, who was competing in the rally for the first time, on the fourth stage between Er Rachidia and Ouarzazate. He was the 47th competitor to die taking part in the Dakar. The second death occurred on the 14th and penultimate stage; French motorcyclist Eric Aubijoux was found dead  from the finish line in Dakar.  Initial reports indicated he had suffered a fatal heart attack.   Later investigations indicated he had been involved earlier in an accident with another vehicle.

References

2007
2007 in rallying
2007 in African sport
2007 in European sport
2007 in French motorsport